Jarwaans, also spelled as Jarbaas, was once a village, and is now a suburb in Khurai City in Madhya Pradesh.

Demographics

 

Khurai
Villages in Sagar district